Gail Kobe (born Gabriella Kieliszewski; March 19, 1932 – August 1, 2013) was an American actress and television producer.

Early years
Kobe was born Gabriella Kieliszewski in Hamtramck, Michigan (near Detroit) to Benjamin and Theresa Kobe. She had one sister,  Beatrice Kobe Adamski, who predeceased her. Kobe graduated from UCLA earning a fine arts degree in theatre and dance. Kobe had polio as a child and began dancing as a form of therapy. A heart murmur that she developed in her high school years caused her to cease dancing. She graduated from Hamtramck High School.

Early career 
Kobe portrayed Penny Adams on the TV series Trackdown. She appeared on the Alcoa Theatre in a 1958 episode titled "Disappearance" starring Jack Lemmon and Joan Blackman. In 1965 she portrayed Doris Schuster on TV's Peyton Place. She also appeared on daytime television in the NBC serial Bright Promise as Ann Boyd Jones (1970–1972).

During the 1950s and 1960s, Kobe made guest appearances on Highway Patrol ("The Search"), The O. Henry Playhouse ("The Guilty Party"), The Californians, The Rebel, Mackenzie's Raiders, Blue Light, Felony Squad, Ironside, The Outer Limits, Richard Diamond, Private Detective, The Fugitive,
Bourbon Street Beat, Maverick, M Squad (four episodes), Whirlybirds, Perry Mason, Hogan's Heroes, The Twilight Zone ("In His Image", "The Self-Improvement of Salvadore Ross", "A World of Difference"), Dr. Kildare, Empire, Gunsmoke (S3E25 "Dirt", S12E13 "The Moonstone" and S14E23 "The Intruder"), Cheyenne, Daniel Boone, Mission: Impossible, The Untouchables, Have Gun – Will Travel, The Mod Squad, The Alfred Hitchcock Hour, and Mannix. In 1962, she portrayed Dr. Louise Amadon in the episode "A Woman's Place" on Rawhide, about a woman doctor's struggles against stereotypes in the Old West. In 1963 she appeared in Combat! as Francois.

On February 17, 1959, Kobe was cast in the episode "Disaster Town" of the series Rescue 8 in the role of Ellen Mason, a mother looking for her son in a western ghost town.

In the series, Laramie, Kobe played a saloon girl in the episode "Gun Duel" (aired December 25, 1962).

Later career
Kobe began to work behind the camera as supervising producer and associate producer on such daytime programs as CBS's The Edge of Night and NBC's Return to Peyton Place. From 1981 to 1982, its final year on the air, Kobe became executive producer of the NBC soap opera, Texas. From 1983 to May 1986, she was the executive producer of CBS's Guiding Light (for which she was nominated for a Daytime Emmy Award) and then served as a producer on CBS's The Bold and the Beautiful from its debut in 1987 through the early 1990s.

Kobe taught at San Fernando Valley State College.

Kobe was a member of St. Louis Church. She volunteered many hours to Eisenhower Medical Center and the Palm Springs Art Museum while she lived in Palm Springs. While she resided at the Motion Picture Television Fund Home in Woodland Hills, California, she organized the program, We've Got Mail, which airs on cable Channel 22.

Honors
In 2008, a Golden Palm Star on the Walk of Stars was dedicated in Kobe's honor.

Death
For the last two years of her life, the twice-married Kobe resided at the Motion Picture & Television Country House and Hospital in Woodland Hills. She died on August 1, 2013, aged 81, from undisclosed causes in Michigan.

Filmography

References

External links

 
 Notice of death of Gail Kobe, deadline.com; accessed February 26, 2014.

1932 births
2013 deaths
Actresses from Michigan
American soap opera actresses
American television actresses
20th-century American actresses
Television producers from California
American women television producers
American people of Polish descent
People from Hamtramck, Michigan
Actresses from Palm Springs, California
University of California, Los Angeles alumni
Television producers from Michigan
21st-century American women